Mesocoelopodinae is a subfamily of death-watch and spider beetles in the family Ptinidae. There are at least 4 genera and 100 described species in Mesocoelopodinae.

The subfamily Mesocoelopodinae, along with Anobiinae and several others, were formerly considered members of the family Anobiidae, but the family name has since been changed to Ptinidae.

Genera
These four genera belong to the subfamily Mesocoelopodinae:
 Cryptorama  i c g
 Mesocoelopus  i c g b
 Neosothes  i g
 Tricorynus  i c g

Data sources: i = ITIS, c = Catalogue of Life, g = GBIF, b = Bugguide.net

References

Further reading

External links
 

Ptinidae